Pseudostomatella cycloradiata is a species of sea snail, a marine gastropod mollusk in the family Trochidae, the top snails.

Description
The maximum reported size of the shell is 5 mm

Distribution
This marine species occurs off the Lesser Antilles (Virgin Islands: St. Croix; Antigua)

References

 Usticke, G. W. Nowell. 1959. A Check List of Marine Shells of St. Croix.  vi + 90, 4 pls. Author: Christiansted, St. Croix.

External links
 To Encyclopedia of Life
 To World Register of Marine Species

cycloradiata
Gastropods described in 1959